The Nightengale House is a historic house at 24 Quincy Street in Quincy, Massachusetts.  The -story wood-frame house was built in the 1850s, probably by Thomas Nightengale, whose son Jerimiah got the property around 1876.  It is a worker's cottage somewhat typical of many built during that time, with Greek Revival and Gothic Revival decorative elements.  Its front facade originally had pilasters at the corners, rising to a frieze, but these details have been lost by the application of siding (see photo).  Its surviving Gothic details include the steeply pitched front dormers, and pointed-arch windows in the end gables.

The house was listed on the National Register of Historic Places in 1989.

See also
National Register of Historic Places listings in Quincy, Massachusetts

References

Houses completed in 1855
Houses in Quincy, Massachusetts
National Register of Historic Places in Quincy, Massachusetts
Houses on the National Register of Historic Places in Norfolk County, Massachusetts
Greek Revival architecture in Massachusetts